Lena Himmelstein Bryant Malsin (March 1877 – September 26, 1951) was an American clothing designer and retailer who founded the plus-size clothing chain Lane Bryant. Despite difficult circumstances, she saw a need and came up with a solution that revolutionized the women's fashion industry.

Early life and career
Lena Himmelstein was born to a Lithuanian Jewish family in Kaunas, Lithuania. She became an orphan shortly after birth as her parents were murdered in a anti-Jewish pogrom, and was then raised by her grandparents in Lithuania. In 1895, she sought refuge in New York City to join her sister Anna, where she found work in a sweat shop at $1 a week. In 1899, she married David Bryant, a Russian Jewish refugee. She moved to Harlem with her husband, who was a jeweler. He died not long after their son Raphael was born. She then lived on West 112th St. in Manhattan, supporting herself and her son by making and selling negligees and tea gowns from delicate laces and fine silks.

In 1904, Bryant moved to Fifth Avenue between 119th and 120th Streets. She rented a shopfront on the first floor of a building for $12.50 a month, with living quarters in the rear. She hung garments from the gas fixtures, and set up shop. Her sister's new husband lent her $300 to open a bank account as working capital for the purchase of fabrics. A bank officer misspelled her name on the application as "Lane", so that became the name of the store.

Bryant earned a reputation for the clothing she made for pregnant women. Bryant created a comfortable and concealing tea gown by attaching an accordion pleated skirt to a bodice using an elastic band. She had created the first known commercially sold maternity dress. Once she was able to advertise in newspapers in 1911, sales increased substantially. Soon she expanded to a new shop at 19 W. 38th Street where she employed a dozen employees. Introducing a mail-order catalogue increased sales further so that the company's revenue was over one million dollars in 1917. Her second innovation was mass producing ready-made clothing for women in larger sizes and this was the basis of further growth, with sales greater than for maternity wear by 1923.

Marriage and family
In 1909, at age 32, she married Albert Malsin. Malsin was a fellow Lithuanian Jewish refugee like Himmelstein. A mechanical engineer with a degree from the Anhalt Polytechnic in Köthen, Germany,  Malsin had worked for a firm that built amusement parks worldwide. Three more children, Theodore, Helen and Arthur, were born to the couple. Her son Raphael served as the company chairman and chief executive of Lane Bryant from 1940-1972, followed in that role by his half-brother Arthur.

Personal life
Lena Bryant Malsin took an active role in Jewish communal charities. She supported the Hebrew Immigrant Aid Society, the New York Federation of Jewish Philanthropies, and a number of other causes. She died on September 26, 1951, at the age of 74, leaving the business to her sons in her last will and testament. She was buried in Mount Pleasant Cemetery in Hawthorne (Westchester County), New York.

References

External links
Biography at jewishvirtuallibrary.org

1877 births
1951 deaths
American businesspeople in retailing
American fashion designers
American women fashion designers
American people of Lithuanian-Jewish descent
Emigrants from the Russian Empire to the United States
Jewish fashion designers
Lithuanian fashion designers
Lithuanian Jews
Lithuanian women fashion designers
People from Morningside Heights, Manhattan